The Honda Bali is a  two-stroke twist and go scooter from Honda. The scooter has self-starter and autolub system to mix two-stroke oil with fuel. The top speed with 85 kg load is around 80 km/h. Front brake is disc while rear is drum.

The scooter weighs around 93 kg, Fuel capacity is 7 liters and oil capacity (two-stroke oil) is 1.2 liters. Its automatic dry centrifugal clutch is driven by V-belt. Engine compression ratio is 6:1.

This Scooter is produced by Honda Italia Industriale in Atessa, Italy since March 1993.

References

Bali
Two-stroke motorcycles
Motor scooters